The Castanhão Ecological Station is an ecological station (ESEC) in the state of Ceará, Brazil.
It protects an area of caatinga vegetation adapted to arid conditions to the south of the Castanhão Dam.

Location

The Castanhão Ecological Station is divided between the municipalities of Alto Santo (0.75%), Iracema (15.2%) and Jaguaribara (84.04%) in the state of Ceará.
It is in the Sertaneja Depression of the Sertanejos Residual Plateaus.
Terrain is mostly smooth or gently undulating.
The ESEC is in the Jaguaribe River basin, which covers just over 51% of the state.

History

The Castanhão Dam is one of the most important projects of DNOCS (National Department of Drought Works) and the largest dam in Brazil on an intermittent river.
It was controversial, forcing relocation of thousands of people and relocation of the municipal seat of Jaguaribara.
The Castanhão Ecological Station was created in compensation for the environmental impact of the dam.

The ESEC was created by federal decree on 27 September 2001.
It is administered by the Chico Mendes Institute for Biodiversity Conservation (ICMBio).
The ESEC is classed as IUCN protected area category Ia (strict nature reserve).
Objectives are to protect and preserve samples of the caatinga ecosystem, and to enable development of scientific research and environmental education programs.

This was because the high areas contain the sources of the rivers, important for conservation.
IBAMA would install an office in Nova Jaguaribara for research into the caatinga, and the flora and fauna of the area.

Environment

The ESEC has a tropical southern austral semi-arid climate. 

36% of the area is used for agriculture and 15.7% is devoid of vegetation.
18.2% contains original vegetation.
Native vegetation is mostly woody, grassy savanna in the caatinga biome, with scattered shrub sized hyperxerophilic plants.
The main species are Mimosa acustipula and Crotoneae species, pioneer plants following strong human disruption of the environment.

Notes

Sources

Ecological stations of Brazil
Protected areas established in 2001
2001 establishments in Brazil
Protected areas of Ceará
Caatinga